Arroio do Padre (Portuguese meaning Priest's Stream) is a Brazilian municipality in the southeastern part of the state of Rio Grande do Sul. Its 2020 population was 2,951.

Much of the population have Pomeranian origin and are Evangelical Lutheran.

Mayors

References

External links
 Official website of the prefecture

Municipalities in Rio Grande do Sul
Pelotas (micro-region)